Brno astronomical clock (Czech: Brněnský orloj) is a black stone monument in Brno, Czech Republic. It is situated at Náměstí Svobody, the main square in the Brno City Centre. The monument was proposed by Oldřich Rujbr and Petr Kameník. Every day at 11:00 it releases a glass marble, which the spectators can catch from one of four openings in the monument and they can take it with them as a souvenir. Although the monument is publicly known as an astronomical clock (orloj), it is only a clock. Construction of the clock took three years, at a cost of approximately 12 million CZK.

References

Links 

Buildings and structures in Brno
Clocks in the Czech Republic
2010 establishments in the Czech Republic
Buildings and structures completed in 2010
21st-century architecture in the Czech Republic